KONO may refer to:

 KONO (AM), a radio station (860 AM) in San Antonio, Texas, United States
 KONO-FM, a radio station (101.1 FM) in Helotes, Texas, United States
 KSAT-TV, a television station (channel 12) in San Antonio, Texas, United States that had the call signs KONO from 1957 to 1969
 The ICAO identifier for Ontario Municipal Airport in Ontario, Oregon, United States
 Masayuki Kono, also known as KONO, Japanese professional wrestler and mixed martial artist

See also
 Kono (disambiguation)
 Konno, a surname
 Kouno (disambiguation)